Tök is a village in Pest county, Hungary. It is located 30 km from Budapest, on the edge of the Zsámbék basin.

Sister cities
  Wettenberg – Germany
  Gemerské Michalovce – Slovakia
  Horgos – Serbia

References

Populated places in Pest County